The Kamakã language (Kamakan), or Ezeshio, is an extinct language of a small family, belonging to the Macro-Jê languages of Brazil. Kotoxó and Mongoyó/Mangaló are sometimes included as dialects.

Phonology 

 /ə/ can also be realized as a back vowel sound [ʌ].

 /ɾ/ can be in free variation with a fricative [ʒ] and a lateral [l].
 /n/ is heard as [ŋ] when preceding /k/.

Classification
Kamakã is a Macro-Jê language. It was spoken by several groups of indigenous peoples who lived in Bahia, including the Kamakã, Mongoyó, Menién, Kotoxó and Masakará.

References

Sources 
 Eduardo Rivail Ribeiro, Hein van der Voort, Nimuendajú Was Right : The Inclusion of the Jabuti Language Family in the Macro-Jê Stock, International Journal of American Linguistics, 76:4, pp. 517-570, 2010.

Extinct languages of South America
Languages extinct in the 20th century
Kamakã languages
Indigenous languages of Northeastern Brazil